The Morell Bridge is an arch bridge over the Yarra River in South Yarra, Melbourne,  Victoria, Australia. Completed in 1899 by John Monash and J. T. N. Anderson, it is notable as the first bridge in Victoria that was built using reinforced concrete.

It features decorations on the three arch spans, including large dragon motifs and ornamental Victorian lights.  The gutters on the bridge are cobbled bluestone, with a single lane bitumen strip running down the middle. The bridge is listed on the Victorian Heritage Register.

Originally known as the Anderson Street bridge, it was named the Morell Bridge in 1936 after Sir Stephen Morell,
who was a prominent Victorian businessman and Lord Mayor of Melbourne between 1926 and 1928.

On 7 June 1998 the bridge was closed to motor vehicles as part of the CityLink project. It is currently  used by cyclist and pedestrian traffic, connecting the Royal Botanic Gardens to the Olympic Park precinct.

Engineering heritage award 
The bridge received an Engineering Heritage Marker from Engineers Australia as part of its Engineering Heritage Recognition Program.

References

External links
 
 

Pedestrian bridges in Melbourne
Bridges over the Yarra River
Heritage-listed buildings in Melbourne
1899 establishments in Australia
Bridges completed in 1899
Recipients of Engineers Australia engineering heritage markers
Buildings and structures in the City of Melbourne (LGA)
Transport in the City of Melbourne (LGA)